Michał Twaróg of Bystrzyków (c. 1450–1520) was a Polish philosopher and theologian of the early 16th century.

Life
Michał Twaróg studied at Paris in 1473–77, during the period when, following the anathematization of the Nominalists (1473), the Scotist school of philosophy enjoyed its greatest triumphs there. He  brought Scotism to Poland and taught at the Jagiellonian University in Kraków from 1485,  serving as its rector in 1513–14.

Twaróg was the author of many works of philosophy and theology revered by contemporary historians. As the abbot of the collegiate church in Wojnicz (1497–1520) he supported financially the functioning of the local hospital. A prominent student of Twaróg was Jan of Stobnica (c.1470–1519), a moderate Scotist, professor at the same Jagiellonian University (Kraków Academy) between 1498 and 1514, who took account also of the theories of the Ockhamists, Thomists and Humanists.

See also
List of Poles

Notes

References
 George J. Lerski, Jerzy Jan Lerski, Piotr Wróbel, Richard J. Kozicki,  Historical dictionary of Poland, 966-1945 Published by Greenwood Publishing Group. Page 221
 Wirtualna Polska, Encyklopedia,  Michał z Bystrzykowa
 Edward H. Lewinski-Corwin,  The Political History of Poland, University of California, San Diego. Copyright, 1917.
 Miasto i Gmina Wojnicz, official website,  ZASŁUŻENI WOJNICZANIE

External links
 Works by Michał Twaróg of Bystrzyków in digital library Polona

University of Paris alumni
Academic staff of Jagiellonian University
1450s births
1520 deaths
16th-century Polish philosophers